Edward Mary Fitzgerald (October 28, 1833—February 21, 1907) was an Irish-born American prelate of the Roman Catholic Church. He served as bishop of the Diocese of Little Rock in Arkansas from 1867 until his death in 1907.

Biography

Early life 
Edward Fitzgerald was born in Limerick to James and Joanna (née Pratt) Fitzgerald. He was one of eight children one of whom, Joseph, also became a priest.  In 1849 he and his parents immigrated to the United States in the aftermath of the Great Famine of Ireland. He attended St. Mary's of the Barrens Seminary at Perryville, Missouri, from 1850 to 1852.  Fitzgerald completed his theological studies at Mount St. Mary's Seminary of the West in Cincinnati, Ohio and at Mount St. Mary's College in Emmitsburg, Maryland.

Priesthood 
Fitzgerald was ordained to the priesthood by Archbishop John Baptist Purcell on August 22, 1857. His first and only assignment was pastor of St. Patrick's Parish in Columbus where he healed a divisive ethnic schism between the Irish and German immigrants. He gained his American citizenship in 1859.

During the American Civil War, Fitzgerald organized an Irish-American military company called the Montgomery Guards that fought on the Union side.  He frequently visited Camp Chase in Columbus to minister to Confederate Army prisoners.

Bishop of Little Rock 
On April 24, 1866, Fitzgerald was appointed the second bishop of the Diocese of Little Rock by Pope Pius IX. Fitzgerald initially refused the appointment, but was commanded by the Holy See to accept it in December 1866. He received his episcopal consecration on February 3, 1867, from Archbishop Purcell, with Bishops John Lynch and Sylvester Rosecrans serving as co-consecrators, at St. Patrick's Church. At age 33, he was the youngest member of the American hierarchy.

Fitzgerald presided over a period of great growth in the Little Rock Diocese. Arriving in Arkansas by steamboat in March 1867, he found four parishes, five priests, and 1,600 Catholics; by the time of his death in 1907, there were 41 churches with resident priests, 32 missions, 60 priests, and 20,000 Catholics. He first rebuilt the churches and missions ravaged by the Civil War. From 1869 to 1870, he attended the First Vatican Council in Rome. At the Council, Fitzgerald was one of the only two bishops (the other being Aloisio Riccio) to vote against papal infallibility. While he believed in the theological grounds for infallibility, he feared that its dogmatic definition would hamper the conversion of non-Catholics in Arkansas. However, he fully submitted to the Council's decision when the tally ended.

Fitzgerald encouraged Catholic immigration to Arkansas from Germany, Italy, and Poland; introduced the Benedictine Sisters and the Sisters of Charity; and established St. Benedict's Priory. He laid the cornerstone of St. Andrew's Cathedral in July 1878, and dedicated it in November 1881. Fitzgerald delivered the opening sermon at the Third Plenary Council of Baltimore in 1884, and opened St. Vincent's Infirmary (the first hospital in Arkansas) in 1888. In 1894 he dedicated the first Catholic church in Arkansas for African Americans, at Pine Bluff.

Fitzgerald suffered a stroke in January 1900, and was subsequently paralyzed. Pope Pius X appointed Father John Morris as his coadjutor bishop in June 1906. Fitzgerald also suffered from depression, once writing, "I find in me a growing dislike in making exertions of any kind, a bad sign in me, no longer a young man...I am overwhelmed with despondency and gloom."

Death and legacy 
Edward Fitzgerald died at St. Joseph's Hospital in Hot Springs, Arkansas, on February 20, 1907, at age 73. He is buried in a crypt under St. Andrew's Cathedral.

References

1833 births
1907 deaths
Clergy from Limerick (city)
Irish emigrants to the United States (before 1923)
The Athenaeum of Ohio alumni
Mount St. Mary's University alumni
Roman Catholic Archdiocese of Cincinnati
Roman Catholic bishops of Little Rock
19th-century Roman Catholic bishops in the United States
20th-century Roman Catholic bishops in the United States
Participants in the First Vatican Council